The compound of two great retrosnub icosidodecahedra is a uniform polyhedron compound. It's composed of the 2 enantiomers of the great retrosnub icosidodecahedron.

References 
.

Polyhedral compounds